The 1973 Nebraska Cornhuskers football team represented the University of Nebraska–Lincoln in the 1973 NCAA Division I football season.  The team was coached by Tom Osborne and played their home games in Memorial Stadium in Lincoln.

Schedule

Roster

Coaching staff

Game summaries

UCLA

The Tom Osborne era at Nebraska began in style, as the Cornhuskers exacted revenge for last year's loss to UCLA by beating the #10 Bruins in Lincoln 40-13.  Nebraska jumped out to a 14-0 lead in less than 10 minutes, and though UCLA scored to come within 7, that was as close as they'd get for the rest of the game as the Blackshirts shut out the Bruins entirely in the 2nd half.

NC State

It was touch and go for Nebraska as the Cornhuskers fought to stay even with NC State until blowing the game wide open in the 4th quarter with three straight unanswered touchdowns.

Wisconsin

Wisconsin fought Nebraska to a 7-7 tie entering the 4th quarter before pulling ahead by 3 on a field goal with 8 minutes to go.  The Cornhuskers replied with a touchdown, which was promptly answered by a 96-yard Badger kickoff return to put Nebraska behind again.  Nebraska again responded, marching 83 yards in just seven plays to score again for the win.

Minnesota

Minnesota QB Tony Dungy managed to get a 1st-quarter touchdown, and that would be the last time the Golden Gophers saw the scoreboard, as the first Minnesota sellout since 1960 (with help from the numerous traveling Cornhusker fans) watched Nebraska dismantle the Gophers 48-7.

Missouri

Missouri handed coach Tom Osborne his first career defeat as Nebraska's 2-point conversion for the win with 1:00 remaining was intercepted, marking the first time Coach Osborne decided to forgo the tie and take a shot at the win, an approach later repeated to much attention in the 1984 Orange Bowl.

Kansas

    
    
    
    

Kansas avoided the 1st half shutout on a recovered Nebraska fumble converted into a field goal.  The Jayhawks then came out from halftime and continued to hold off Nebraska while putting in their own touchdown late in the 3rd to pull ahead, though the PAT was blocked.  Less than five minutes later, Nebraska responded with a field goal to pull ahead by 1 point, where a tie would have existed had the previous Kansas PAT attempt been good.  From there on out, the Blackshirts held on for the rest of the quarter to preserve the razor thin winning margin.

Oklahoma State

With 2:23 remaining in a fierce contest, no scoring since the previous quarter, and a 17-17 tie still on the board, Nebraska opted to forgo the easy field goal and instead attempted to go for it on 4th and goal inside the Cowboys' one yard line, but the attempt failed, and both teams were forced to settle for a tie.

Colorado

Source:

Colorado never really had a chance in this game, as Nebraska rolled out to an early 28-3 lead by the half.  The final Cornhusker touchdown was a change of plans, after a field goal setup was moved towards the end zone due to a Colorado penalty, and Nebraska instead decided to run one in.  The 4th quarter Buffalo touchdown was made on a trick play against Nebraska reserves who had entered the game to mop up.

Iowa State

Once again, Nebraska ran out to a substantial early lead and coasted in for the win, as the game was essentially decided when the Cornhuskers put in a 67-yard pass touchdown just before the half.  Nebraska reserves entered the game in the 4th and put in a touchdown to further pad the win.

Kansas State

Kansas State never was in this game, as the Cornhuskers blasted the Wildcats for a 23-0 1st half lead and never really slowed down, rolling up 612 yards of total offense along the way.  The performances of Nebraska IB Tony Davis and IB John O'Leary on the day marked the first time two Cornhusker runners exceeded 100 yards in the same game.

Oklahoma

Oklahoma completely dismantled Nebraska in every way, as the Cornhuskers were shut out for the first time since 1968, an indignity that would not be repeated until Miami defeated Nebraska in the 1992 Orange Bowl eighteen years later.  The Cornhuskers were held to just 74 ground yards and 174 yards of total offense as the Nebraska offense never crossed mid-field.

Texas

SWC champion Texas put up the first points early in the 1st quarter with a field goal, but never saw the scoreboard again as Nebraska fought back to a 3-3 tie by the half, and then shut down the Longhorns' efforts afterwards by blocking a field goal and recovering a Texas fumble along the way to creating a comfortable lead by the end of the 3rd quarter.  It was the Huskers fifth consecutive bowl victory.

Rankings

Awards

1973 Team Players in the NFL

The 1973 Nebraska Cornhuskers seniors selected in the 1974 NFL Draft:

The 1973 Nebraska Cornhuskers juniors selected in the following year's 1975 NFL Draft:

The 1973 Nebraska Cornhuskers sophomores selected in the 1976 NFL Draft:

NFL and Pro Players
The following is a list of 1973 Nebraska playerswho joined a professional team as draftees or free agents.

References

Nebraska
Nebraska Cornhuskers football seasons
Cotton Bowl Classic champion seasons
Nebraska Cornhuskers football